St. Antoine was a federal electoral district in Quebec, Canada, that was represented in the House of Commons of Canada from 1892 to 1935.

This riding was created in 1892 from parts of Montreal West riding. It consisted initially of St. Antoine ward in the city of Montreal. In 1914, it was defined to consist of St. Andrew's and St. Joseph wards in the city of Montreal.

The electoral district was abolished in 1933 when it was redistributed into Saint-Henri, Saint-Antoine—Westmount and St. Lawrence—St. George ridings.

Members of Parliament

This riding elected the following Members of Parliament:

Election results

By-election: On Mr. Mitchell's resignation, 14 May 1924

See also 

 List of Canadian federal electoral districts
 Past Canadian electoral districts

External links 
 Riding history from the Library of Parliament

Former federal electoral districts of Quebec